In the differential geometry of curves, the evolute of a curve is the locus of all its centers of curvature. That is to say that when the center of curvature of each point on a curve is drawn, the resultant shape will be the evolute of that curve. The evolute of a circle is therefore a single point at its center.  Equivalently, an evolute is the envelope of the normals to a curve.

The evolute of a curve, a surface, or more generally a submanifold, is the caustic of the normal map. This defines a Lagrangian map, called the normal map.

Evolutes are closely connected to involutes: A curve is the evolute of any of its involutes.

History 
Apollonius ( 200 BC) discussed evolutes in Book V of his Conics. However, Huygens is sometimes credited with being the first to study them (1673). Huygens formulated his theory of evolutes sometime around 1659 to help solve the problem of finding the tautochrone curve, which in turn helped him construct an isochronous pendulum. This was because the tautochrone curve is a cycloid, and the cycloid has the unique property that its evolute is also a cycloid. The theory of evolutes, in fact, allowed Huygens to achieve many results that would later be found using calculus.

Evolute of a parametric curve 
If  is the parametric representation of a regular curve in the plane with its curvature nowhere 0 and  its curvature radius and  the unit normal pointing to the curvature center, then

describes the  evolute of the given curve.

For  and  one gets
 and

Properties of the evolute 

Hence the tangent vector of the evolute  is:

From this equation one gets the following properties of the evolute:
At points with  the evolute is not regular. That means: at points with maximal or minimal curvature (vertices of the given curve) the evolute has cusps. (See the diagrams of the evolutes of the parabola, the ellipse, the cycloid and the nephroid.)
For any arc of the evolute that does not include a cusp, the length of the arc equals the difference between the radii of curvature at its endpoints. This fact leads to an easy proof of the Tait–Kneser theorem on nesting of osculating circles.
The normals of the given curve at points of nonzero curvature are tangents to the evolute, and the normals of the curve at points of zero curvature are asymptotes to the evolute. Hence: the evolute is the envelope of the normals of the given curve. 
(In the diagram: The blue parabola is an involute of the red semicubic parabola, which is actually the evolute of the blue parabola.)

Proof of the last property:
Let be  at the section of consideration. An involute of the evolute can be described as follows:

where  is a fixed string extension (see Involute of a parameterized curve ).
With  and  one gets 

That means: For the string extension  the given curve is reproduced.

Parallel curves have the same evolute.
Hence the evolute of the parallel curve is

Examples

Evolute of a parabola 
For the parabola with the parametric representation  one gets from the formulae above the equations:

which describes a semicubic parabola

Evolute of an ellipse 
For the ellipse with the parametric representation  one gets:

These are the equations of a non symmetric astroid. 
Eliminating parameter  leads to the implicit representation

Evolute of a cycloid
For the cycloid with the parametric representation  the evolute will be:

which describes a transposed replica of itself.

Evolutes of some curves 
The evolute 
 of a parabola is a semicubic parabola (see above), 
 of an ellipse is a non symmetric astroid (see above),
of a line is an ideal point,
 of a nephroid is a nephroid (half as large, see diagram),
 of an astroid is an astroid (twice as large),
 of a cardioid is a cardioid (one third as large),
 of a circle is its center,
 of a deltoid is a deltoid (three times as large),
 of a cycloid is a congruent cycloid,
 of a logarithmic spiral is the same logarithmic spiral,
 of a tractrix is a catenary.

Radial curve 
A curve with a similar definition is the radial of a given curve. For each point on the curve take the vector from the point to the center of curvature and translate it so that it begins at the origin. Then the locus of points at the end of such vectors is called the radial of the curve. This produces

References

 
 
 Yates, R. C.: A Handbook on Curves and Their Properties, J. W. Edwards (1952), "Evolutes." pp. 86ff
 Evolute on 2d curves.

Differential geometry
Curves